Sant'Angelo a Segno, Naples
Sant’Angelo a Segno or Sant’Archangelo a Segno is a Roman Catholic church in Naples, Italy, located on Via dei Tribunali number 45.

History
This church recalls the apparition of St Michael, the church's patron, alongside the army of Giacomo di Marra and the bishop Sant'Agnello of Naples (also called Sant'Aniello Abate) during a 6th-century repulse of besieging Lombards. The church was called a Segno (a sign) because it putatively had a nail driven into the marble as a testament that here was the limit of Lombard penetration into Naples. Other sources anachronistically invoke battles against the Saracens.

A plaque at the front door still commemorates the victory of in Neapolitan forces over the Lombards. A church at the site likely dates to the 7th century, although the present structure dates to a reconstruction in 1825 by Luigi Malesi. The artworks once inside the church are now in the Museo di Capodimonte: including a Circumcision of Christ (1622) by Simon Vouet, St Thomas of Canterbury, a work by a member of the school of Giovanni Balducci, Santa Rosa,  by Simonelli, a member of the school of Luca Giordano, and the main altarpiece of St Michael Archangel by Francesco Pagano. The church is closed for worship.

See also

Churches in Naples

References

Former churches in Naples
19th-century Roman Catholic church buildings in Italy